Lightning Range is a 1933 American Western film directed by Victor Adamson and starring Buddy Roosevelt, Patsy Bellamy and Lafe McKee.

Cast
 Buddy Roosevelt as Deputy Marshal Buddy 
 Patsy Bellamy as Dorothy Horton 
 Lafe McKee as Judge Williams 
 Olin Francis as Black Pete 
 Si Jenks as Hezekiah Simmons 
 Anne Howard as Hester 
 Bartlett A. Carre as Jim 
 Ken Broeker as Sheriff 
 William Barrymore as Boob 
 Clyde McClary as Miner 
 Betty Butler as Eastern Girl 
 Jack Evans as Jack Knife 
 Jack Bronston as Deputy Sheriff 
 Victor Adamson as Bridegroom

References

Bibliography
 Michael R. Pitts. Poverty Row Studios, 1929–1940: An Illustrated History of 55 Independent Film Companies, with a Filmography for Each. McFarland & Company, 2005.

External links
 

1933 films
1933 Western (genre) films
American Western (genre) films
Films directed by Victor Adamson
1930s English-language films
1930s American films